William Andrew Harris Jr. (born January 17, 1946) is a former American football running back. He played for the Atlanta Falcons in 1968, the Minnesota Vikings in 1969 and for the New Orleans Saints in 1971.

References

1946 births
Living people
American football running backs
Colorado Buffaloes football players
Atlanta Falcons players
Minnesota Vikings players
New Orleans Saints players